FK Lokomotiva Skopje is a football club based in the Karpoš neighborhood of Skopje, North Macedonia. They are currently competing in the Macedonian Second League.

History
The club was founded in 1954, as the railway club, therefore it was sometimes called ŽFK Lokomotiva. In the past they  played their matches on the home ground of FK Rabotnički, and so often youth players from Rabotnički came to the club for development. Many decades later it  moved to the current stadium location in Skopje settlement Karpoš. To the older generation it was known as Komunalec, because on that field played FK Komunalec, and also the club FK Vanila, but now neither team exists anymore. Lokomotiva for the first time in its history during the 2007/08 season, played in the Macedonian Second League.

Current squad 
As of 26 February 2023.

References

External links
Club info at MacedonianFootball 
Football Federation of Macedonia 

Lokomotiva
Association football clubs established in 1954
1954 establishments in the Socialist Republic of Macedonia